Back Pay is a 1930 American Pre-Code drama film with songs, produced and distributed by First National Pictures, a subsidiary of Warner Bros., and starring Corinne Griffith and Grant Withers. It is based on a short story by Fannie Hurst. It is a remake of a 1922 silent film Back Pay that starred Seena Owen.

A woman leaves her hometown and her boyfriend, and becomes a kept woman in New York. Her former boyfriend returns from a war, blind and with injured lungs. The woman attempts to nurse him back to health, although she has been warned that he is dying.

Synopsis
Hester Bevins is tired of living in the small town where she has lived all her life. Although she has a boyfriend, Gerald Smith, who is in love with her, she deserts him and takes a train to New York with a traveling salesman. Bevins meets a rich older man, Charles Wheeler, who provides her with all the luxuries she wants in return for being his girlfriend.

She encounters Smith, who, thinking that she is still single and has a job in the city, proposes marriage, but she refuses saying that it is now impossible. Disillusioned, he signs up for the war and ends up being gassed, suffering lung damage and blindness. When the news reaches Bevins, she immediately goes to see him and attempts to nurse him back to health. When the doctor tells her that Smith has only a short time left to live, Bevins asks Wheeler's permission to marry Smith before he dies. She finds peace and happiness in her brief relationship with Smith. After Smith dies in her arms, Bevins decides to end her sordid relationship with Wheeler and return to working for a living.

Cast
Corinne Griffith as Hester Bevins
Grant Withers as Gerald Smith
Montagu Love as Charles G. Wheeler
Hallam Cooley as Al Bloom
Vivien Oakland as Kitty (* billed as Vivian Oakland)
Geneva Mitchell as Babe
William Bailey as Ed

Songs
"They Didn't Believe Me" [music and lyrics by Jerome Kern] Sung by Corrine Griffith

Preservation
Back Pay has been preserved in the Library of Congress. The film has been shown on television and cable. Back Pay was released on DVD by the Warner Archive Collection in Spring 2012.

References

External links
 
 

1930 films
1930 drama films
American drama films
American black-and-white films
Remakes of American films
Sound film remakes of silent films
Films directed by William A. Seiter
Films based on short fiction
First National Pictures films
Warner Bros. films
Films based on works by Fannie Hurst
1930s English-language films
1930s American films
Films with screenplays by Francis Edward Faragoh
Films about blind people